Bellator 294: Carmouche vs. Bennett 2 is a mixed martial arts event produced by Bellator MMA that will take place on April 21, 2023, at the Neal S. Blaisdell Arena in Honolulu, Hawaii, United States.

Background 
The opening bout of a two-night doubleheader will see flyweight champion Liz Carmouche defending her title against DeAnna Bennett on April 21 at the Neal S. Blaisdell Center in Honolulu. 

Bennett and Carmouche previously squared off in September 2020, with Carmouche submitting Bennett in both fighters' Bellator debuts. Prior to receiving a championship chance against reigning champion Juliana Velasquez at Bellator 278, the former two-time UFC title contender won four straight fights. In their rematch at Bellator 289, Carmouche TKO'd Velasquez to win the championship and ended her once again  Since losing to Carmouche in her promotional debut, Bennett hasn't had a defeat. The former contestant of "The Ultimate Fighter 26" has won three straight fights, including decisions over Justine Kish in back-to-back bouts.

Bellator 294 was dedicated for military and first responders meaning that there will be no tickets on sale to the general public.

Fight card

See also 

 2023 in Bellator MMA
 List of Bellator MMA events
 List of current Bellator fighters
 Bellator MMA Rankings

References 

Sports competitions in Honolulu
Bellator MMA events
2023 in mixed martial arts
April 2023 sports events in the United States
2023 in sports in Hawaii
Mixed martial arts in Hawaii
Sports competitions in Hawaii
Scheduled mixed martial arts events